Koh-Lanta: Malaisie is the twelfth regular season and the fifteenth season overall of the French reality television series Koh-Lanta. This season has 20 contestants compete in two tribes of twenty in Seribuat, Malaysia competing in challenges for rewards & immunity to avoid going to tribal council to vote off one of their own. The main twist this season is after the first challenges, the contestants do a schoolyard pick until there's 4 left. The 4 not selected are banished to another island until the first tribal council where they'll return and reintegrate with the two tribes. The season premiered on 2 November 2012 & concluded on 1 February 2013 where Ugo Lartiche won against Brice Martinet in a 10-1 jury vote to win €100,000 & win the title of Sole Survivor.

Contestants

Future appearances
Sara Tallon & Philippe Bizet returned in Koh-Lanta: La Nouvelle Édition. Javier Rodriguez returned in Koh-Lanta: Le Combat des Héros. Tallon competed again in Koh-Lanta: L'Île des héros. Brice Martinet competed in the Italian version of Koh-Lanta in 2015 called L'Isola dei Famosi where he finished again as the Runner-up. Bizet returned for a third time alongside Namadia Thaï Thaï and Ugo Lartiche for Koh-Lanta: La Légende.

References

External links

French reality television series
Koh-Lanta seasons
2012 French television seasons
2013 French television seasons
Television shows filmed in Malaysia